Thuraya Al-Baqsami (born 1952) is a Kuwaiti artist and writer.

References

External links
 
 Interview in Art Interview Online Magazine

1952 births
Living people
Kuwaiti women artists
Kuwaiti contemporary artists
Kuwaiti writers